Bill Stamps (22 August 1921 - 4 November 2007) was a former  Australian rules footballer who played with St Kilda in the Victorian Football League (VFL).

Notes

External links 

1921 births
2007 deaths
Australian rules footballers from Victoria (Australia)
St Kilda Football Club players